Mucor piriformis is a plant pathogen that causes a soft rot of several fruits known as Mucor rot. Infection of its host fruits, such as apples and pears, takes place post-harvest. The fungi can also infect citrus fruits.

References

External links 
Index Fungorum
USDA ARS Fungal Database
Mucor Rot - post-harvest diseases of apples and pears

Mucoraceae
Fungal plant pathogens and diseases
Apple tree diseases
Pear tree diseases
Fungi described in 1772